Hydroglyphus is a genus of beetles in the family Dytiscidae, containing the following species:
 Hydroglyphus aethiopicus (Régimbart, 1907)
 Hydroglyphus amamiensis (Satô, 1961)
 Hydroglyphus angularis (Klug, 1834)
 Hydroglyphus angulolineatus (Guignot, 1956)
 Hydroglyphus annamita (Régimbart, 1889)
 Hydroglyphus apertus (Guignot, 1941)
 Hydroglyphus baeri (Régimbart, 1895)
 Hydroglyphus balkei Hendrich, 1999
 Hydroglyphus basalis (W.J. Macleay, 1871)
 Hydroglyphus bilardoi Biström, 1986
 Hydroglyphus borkuanus (Bruneau de Miré & Legros, 1963)
 Hydroglyphus capitatus (Régimbart, 1895)
 Hydroglyphus circulatus (Régimbart, 1889)
 Hydroglyphus confusus (Klug, 1834)
 Hydroglyphus crassifrons (Régimbart, 1903)
 Hydroglyphus daemeli (Sharp, 1882)
 Hydroglyphus dakarensis (Régimbart, 1895)
 Hydroglyphus divisus (Régimbart, 1893)
 Hydroglyphus erannus (Guignot, 1956)
 Hydroglyphus farquharensis (Scott, 1912)
 Hydroglyphus flammulatus (Sharp, 1882)
 Hydroglyphus flaviculus Motschulsky, 1861
 Hydroglyphus flavoguttatus (Régimbart, 1895)
 Hydroglyphus flumineus (Omer-Cooper, 1959)
 Hydroglyphus fufai (Omer-Cooper, 1931)
 Hydroglyphus fulvaster (Guignot, 1955)
 Hydroglyphus fuscipennis (Sharp, 1882)
 Hydroglyphus gabonicus Bilardo & Rocchi, 1990
 Hydroglyphus geminodes (Régimbart, 1895)
 Hydroglyphus geminus (Fabricius, 1792)
 Hydroglyphus godeffroyi (Sharp, 1882)
 Hydroglyphus grammopterus (Zimmermann, 1928)
 Hydroglyphus gujaratensis (Vazirani, 1973)
 Hydroglyphus hamulatus (Gyllenhal, 1813)
 Hydroglyphus hummeli (Falkenström, 1932)
 Hydroglyphus incisus Biström, 1986
 Hydroglyphus incognitus Biström, 1986
 Hydroglyphus inconstans (Régimbart, 1892)
 Hydroglyphus infirmus (Boheman, 1848)
 Hydroglyphus instriatus (Zimmermann, 1928)
 Hydroglyphus intermedius Biström, 1986
 Hydroglyphus japonicus (Sharp, 1873)
 Hydroglyphus kalaharii (Pederzani, 1982)
 Hydroglyphus kifunei (Nakane, 1987)
 Hydroglyphus koppi (Régimbart, 1895)
 Hydroglyphus laeticulus (Sharp, 1882)
 Hydroglyphus leai (Guignot, 1942)
 Hydroglyphus lenzi (Gschwendtner, 1930)
 Hydroglyphus licenti (Feng, 1936)
 Hydroglyphus lineolatus (Boheman, 1848)
 Hydroglyphus lobulatus (Wewalka, 1980)
 Hydroglyphus luteolus (Régimbart, 1899)
 Hydroglyphus major (Sharp, 1882)
 Hydroglyphus marmottani (Guignot, 1941)
 Hydroglyphus mastersii (W.J. Macleay, 1871)
 Hydroglyphus milkoi (Omer-Cooper, 1931)
 Hydroglyphus mysorensis (Régimbart, 1903)
 Hydroglyphus noteroides (Régimbart, 1883)
 Hydroglyphus orientalis (Clark, 1863)
 Hydroglyphus orthogrammus (Sharp, 1882)
 Hydroglyphus ovatus (Bilardo, 1982)
 Hydroglyphus paludivagus (Omer-Cooper, 1959)
 Hydroglyphus pendjabensis (Guignot, 1954)
 Hydroglyphus pentagrammus (Schaum, 1864)
 Hydroglyphus perssoni Biström & Nilsson, 1990
 Hydroglyphus plagiatus (H.J.Kolbe, 1883)
 Hydroglyphus pradhani (Vazirani, 1969)
 Hydroglyphus pseudoctoguttatus Biström, 2000
 Hydroglyphus pseudogeminus (Régimbart, 1877)
 Hydroglyphus regimbarti (Gschwendtner, 1936)
 Hydroglyphus rocchii Biström, 1986
 Hydroglyphus roeri Biström & Wewalka, 1984
 Hydroglyphus shalensis (Omer-Cooper, 1931)
 Hydroglyphus signatellus (Klug, 1834)
 Hydroglyphus signatus (Sharp, 1882)
 Hydroglyphus socotraensis Wewalka, 2004
 Hydroglyphus sordidus (Sharp, 1882)
 Hydroglyphus speculum (Bruneau de Miré & Legros, 1963)
 Hydroglyphus splendidus (Gschwendtner, 1930)
 Hydroglyphus strigicollis (Fairmaire, 1880)
 Hydroglyphus striola (Sharp, 1882)
 Hydroglyphus transvaalensis (Régimbart, 1894)
 Hydroglyphus transversus (Sharp, 1882)
 Hydroglyphus trassaerti (Feng, 1936)
 Hydroglyphus trifasciatus (Watts, 1978)
 Hydroglyphus vitchumwii (Gschwendtner, 1935)
 Hydroglyphus zanzibarensis (Régimbart, 1906)

References

Dytiscidae